Phúc Yên is a city in Vĩnh Phúc Province in the Red River Delta region of Vietnam. As of 2003 the district had a population of 83,352. The district covers an area of 120 km². The district capital lies at Phúc Yên. The city is on National Route 2 heading North-West out of Hanoi to the town of Vĩnh Yên.

References

Populated places in Vĩnh Phúc province
Districts of Vĩnh Phúc province
Cities in Vietnam